Royale Uccle Sport was a Belgian football club from the municipality of Uccle, Brussels.  It was created in 1901 as Uccle Sport and it registered with the Belgian Football Association in 1905 to receive the matricule n°15.

History
In 1914 the club won the second division and was thus promoted to the first division to take place in 1919 (because of World War I).  The club finished 10th (on 12) and then 12th and was back at the top level in 1922–23 for one season.  After a long spell at the second level, R. Uccle Sport (as it was then known since 1926) played one more season in the first division in 1947–48.  In 1990 the club merged with R. Léopold Uccle Forestoise to become R. Uccle Léopold F.C.

Honours
Belgian Second Division:
Winners (3): 1913–14, 1921–22, 1946–47
Belgian Third Division:
Winners (1): 1952–53

References
 Belgian football clubs history
 RSSSF Archive – 1st and 2nd division final tables

Association football clubs established in 1901
Defunct football clubs in Brussels
Association football clubs disestablished in 1990
1901 establishments in Belgium
1990 disestablishments in Belgium
Defunct football clubs in Belgium
Organisations based in Belgium with royal patronage
Belgian Pro League clubs